Torre Pontina is a skyscraper in Latina, the tallest building in the city and one of the highest residential towers in Italy. The foundation of the building was laid in 2007. The building is near the Latinafiori Shopping Center.

See also 
 List of tallest buildings in Italy

External links 
http://www.torrepontina.com/

References 

Residential buildings completed in 2010
Residential skyscrapers in Italy
Skyscraper office buildings in Italy